Qualifier 4 of the Qualifying Round of the 2013 World Baseball Classic was held at Xinzhuang Baseball Stadium, New Taipei City, Taiwan from November 15 to 18, 2012.

Qualifier 4 was a modified double-elimination tournament. The winners for the first games matched up in the second game, while the losers faced each other in an elimination game. The winners of the elimination game then played the losers of the non-elimination game in another elimination game. The remaining two teams then played each other to determine the winners of the Qualifier 4.

Bracket

Results
All times are Taiwan National Standard Time (UTC+08:00).

Philippines 8, Thailand 2

Chinese Taipei 10, New Zealand 0

New Zealand 12, Thailand 2

Chinese Taipei 16, Philippines 0

New Zealand 10, Philippines 6

Chinese Taipei 9, New Zealand 0

See also
 List of sporting events in Taiwan

External links
Official website

Qualifier 4
World Baseball Classic – Qualifier 4
History of New Taipei
International baseball competitions hosted by Taiwan
World Baseball Classic – Qualifier 4
Sport in New Taipei
Xinzhuang District